Frederick Bligh Bond (30 June 1864 – 8 March 1945), generally known by his second given name Bligh, was an English architect, illustrator, archaeologist and psychical researcher.

Early life
Bligh Bond was the son of the Rev. Frederick Hookey Bond. He was born in the Wiltshire town of Marlborough. His family was related to William Bligh, through his nephew Francis Godolphin Bond, Bligh Bond's grandfather. He was also a cousin of Sabine Baring-Gould. He was educated at home by his father, who was headmaster of the Marlborough Royal Free Grammar School. His brother, Francis George Bond, became a major general in the British Army.

Architectural practice

He practised as an architect in Bristol from 1888. His work includes schools, such as the board schools in Barton Hill, Easton, and Southville, Greenbank Elementary School and St George's School. He designed the schools of medicine and engineering at Bristol University and the Music School of Clifton College. He also undertook a number of domestic commissions for the King's Weston estate of Philip Napier Miles, including a number of substantial houses in Shirehampton, the Miles Arms public house in Avonmouth, the now-demolished King's Weston estate office and the public hall in Shirehampton. Cossham Memorial Hospital is also an example of his work. The style of his mature works in the Edwardian years might be described as English Baroque or Queen Anne Revival. In addition he oversaw the restoration of a number of churches, became an acknowledged authority on the history of church architecture, and in 1909 published, with Dom Bede Camm, a two-volume treatise entitled Roodscreens and Roodlofts.

Glastonbury excavations

As early as 1899 Bligh Bond had expressed his belief that the dimensions of the buildings at Glastonbury Abbey were based on gematria, and in 1917 he published, with Thomas Simcox Lea, Gematria, A Preliminary Investigation of the Cabala contained in the Coptic Gnostic Books and of a similar Gematria in the Greek text of the New Testament, which incorporated his own previously published paper, The Geometric Cubit as a Basis of Proportion in the Plans of Mediaeval Buildings.

In 1908 the Church of England appointed him director of excavations at Glastonbury Abbey. Before he was dismissed by Bishop Armitage Robinson in 1921, his excavations rediscovered the nature and dimensions of a number of buildings that had occupied the site. Bond's work at Glastonbury Abbey is one of the first documented examples of psychic archaeology. Bond with the retired navy Captain John Allan Bartlett ("John Alleyne") as a medium claimed to have contacted through automatic writing dead monks and the builder of the Edgar Chapel at Glastonbury, who advised him where to excavate.

In 1919 he published The Gates of Remembrance, which revealed that he had employed psychical methods to guide his excavation of the Glastonbury ruins. As a consequence of these revelations his relations with his employers, who strongly disapproved of spiritualism, deteriorated and he was sacked in 1921.

Archaeologists and skeptics have found Bond's claims dubious. Joseph McCabe suggested that Alleyne and Bond had "steeped themselves, all through the year 1907, in the literature of the subject. They read all that was known about Glastonbury, and lived for months in the medieval atmosphere."

In 1922 Rev. H. J. Wilkins published a detailed criticism of Bond's psychical claims. Wilkins concluded "there is absolutely nothing supermundane in the whole of the script... All that is true in the script could be gathered from historical data or reasonably conjectured by intelligent observation of existing facts and conditions."

Archaeologist Kenneth Feder commented that the "tall church towers, whose existence and locations we are to believe were provided by spirits, actually were recorded and located in a historical document Bond almost surely had already seen. Beyond this, an early drawing of the abbey, and even structural remains visible on the surface, provided clues as to the location of these towers."

Feder also noted that "there was no scientific controls whatsoever" and that it is impossible to tell whether he was actually advised by spirits or whether his expertise in church architecture and information from early drawings helped him locate the chapels he discovered.

Psychical research
Bligh joined the Freemasons in 1889, the Theosophical Society in 1895, the Society for Psychical Research in 1902, the Societas Rosicruciana in Anglia in 1909 and the Ghost Club in 1925.

From 1921 to 1926 he was editor of Psychic Science (then named Quarterly Transactions of the British College of Psychic Science).

In 1926 he emigrated to the US, where he was employed as education secretary of the American Society for Psychical Research (ASPR) and worked as editor on their magazine, Survival. Bligh Bond broke with the ASPR and returned to Britain in 1936, also rejoining the Ghost Club in the process, after supporting accusations against the medium Mina Crandon that she had fraudulently produced thumbprints on wax that she presented as being produced by the spirit of her dead brother, Walter.

During his time in the USA Bond was ordained, and in 1933 consecrated as a bishop, in the Old Catholic Church of America.

Later life
He returned to the United Kingdom in 1935, spending his time in London and Dolgellau, Merionethshire, where he died of a heart attack.

Legacy
Bond is mentioned as part of the background to Deborah Crombie's mystery novel A Finer End (Bantam, 2001). 

On 30 December 2008 Bligh Bond was the subject of a Channel 4 documentary, The Ghosts of Glastonbury, hosted by Tony Robinson, which examined Bligh Bond's claims that he received archaeological information through automatic writing from deceased monks.

Publications
Coates, Richard (2015) Frederick Bligh Bond (1864–1945): A Bibliography of his writings and a list of his buildings

Authored by Bligh Bond

An Architectural Handbook to Glastonbury Abbey (1909)
 Roodscreens and Roodlofts, (journal article, 1909)
The Gate of Remembrance (1918)
The Hill of Vision (Boston: Marshall Jones Co., 1918)
The Company of Avalon, a study of the script of Brother Symon, sub-prior of Winchester abbey in the time of King Stephen (1924)
The Gospel of Philip the Deacon (1932)
The Secret of Immortality (1934)

Co-authored by Bligh Bond

Bligh Bond, F. & Camm, Rev. Dom Bede. Rood screens and rood lofts – 2 vols. Vol. I • Vol. II (London, 1909)
Bligh Bond, F. & Lea, Thomas Simcox. Gematria: A Preliminary Investigation Of The Cabala Contained In The Coptic Gnostic Books (1917)
Bligh Bond, F. & Lea, Thomas Simcox. Materials for the Study of the Apostolic Gnosis, Part I (1919)
Mantle, George E. Glastonbury Abbey: Recent discoveries (G. E Mantle, n.d, c.1926)

Illustrated by Bligh Bond

Baring-Gould, S. An Old English Home and its Dependencies (Methuen & Co, 1898).

References

Further reading

Coates, Richard. (2015). Frederick Bligh Bond (1864-1945): A Bibliography of His Writings and a List of His Buildings. Working Paper. University of the West of England (Research Repository), Bristol.
Feder, Kenneth. (1980). Psychic Archaeology: The Anatomy of Irrationalist Prehistoric Studies. Skeptical Inquirer 4 (4): 32–43.
Hopkinson-Ball, Tim. (2007). The Rediscovery of Glastonbury. The History Press Ltd.
Kenawell, William W. (1965). The Quest at Glastonbury. A Biographical Study of Frederick Bligh Bond. Helix Press.
McKusick, Marshall. (1984). Psychic Archaeology from Atlantis to Oz. Archaeology 37 (5): 48–52.
Schwartz, Stephan A. (1978). The Secret Vaults of Time. Psychic Archaeology and the Quest for Man's Beginnings. Grosset & Dunlap 
Wilkins, Henry John. (1923). A Further Criticism of the Psychical Claims Concerning Glastonbury Abbey and of the Recent Excavations. J. W. Arrowsmith Ltd. (Bond's Reply April, 1924; Wilkins' Reply May, 1924).

External links
 

1864 births
1945 deaths
Old Catholic bishops
English archaeologists
Architects from Bristol
English Old Catholics
English illustrators
English Theosophists
Pseudoarchaeologists
People educated at Marlborough College
Parapsychologists
Fellows of the Royal Institute of British Architects
People from Marlborough, Wiltshire